The Battle of Changde (Battle of Changteh) was a major engagement in the Second Sino-Japanese War in and around the Chinese city of Changde (Changteh) in the province of Hunan. During the battle, the Imperial Japanese Army extensively used chemical weapons.

The purpose of the Japanese offensive was not to hold the city but to maintain pressure on the Chinese National Revolutionary Army to reduce its combat ability in the region and its ability to reinforce the Burma Campaign.

The Japanese were initially successful in their offensive operation by bacteria-infected bombs and captured parts of the city of Changde, which forced civilians to evacuate. However, the Japanese were pinned down in the city by a single Chinese division long enough for other Chinese units to surround them with a counterencirclement. Heavy casualties and the loss of their supply lines then forced the Japanese to withdraw, which returned territorial control to the original status quo.

Some contemporary Western newspapers depicted the battle as a Chinese victory. American government film footage showed victorious Chinese troops with Japanese prisoners and captured Japanese flags and equipment on display after the battle. In addition, an American newsreel titled Chinese troops drive Japs from Changteh showed Chinese troops firing, with dead and captured Japanese on display. A British newsreel titled Japs Loose Changteh Aka Japs Lose Changte showed similar footage.

Battle

Japanese offensive

On 2 November 1943 Isamu Yokoyama, commander of the Imperial Japanese 11th Army, deployed the 39th, 58th, 13th, 3rd, 116th and 68th divisions—a total of around 60,000 troops—to attack Changde from the north and the east. The Changde region was defended by the Chinese 6th War Zone's 10th, 26th, 29th and 33rd Army Groups, as well as a river defense force and two other corps, for a total of 14 corps.

On 14 November the Japanese 13th Division, with aid from collaborators, drove south and broke through the defensive lines of the Chinese 10th and the 29th Group Armies. On 16 November, Japanese airborne forces landed in Taoyuan County to support the assault on the city proper. At the same time, the Japanese 3rd and 116th Divisions also joined the combined assault. The city was guarded by only a single Chinese division - the 74th Corps' 57th Division. Division commander Yu Chengwan led his single division of 8,000 men to fight against the two invading Japanese divisions. Despite being outnumbered by more than three to one, the Chinese stubbornly held onto the city. Eleven days and nights of fierce fighting saw heavy casualties on both sides. When the Chinese reinforcements finally arrived in the city, they managed to evacuate the remaining 100 survivors in the 57th Division, all of whom were wounded, from the city. On 6 December the city of Changde fell to the Japanese control.

While the Chinese 57th Division pinned down the Japanese in the city, the rest of the 74th Corps, as well as the 18th, 73rd, 79th and 100th Corps and the 9th War Zone's 10th Corps, 99th Corps and Jiangxi's 58th Corps, arrived at the battlefield, forming a counter-encirclement on the Japanese forces.

Chinese counter-offensive
Fang Xianjue's 10th Corps was first to strike, successfully retaking Deshan on 29 November before attacking the Japanese positions at Changde from the south. Unable to withstand the fierce Chinese assault, the Japanese utilized chemical weapons. The battle lasted for six days and nights, during which the Chinese Reserve 10th Division's commander Lieutenant General Sun Mingjin received 5 gunshot wounds to the body and was killed in action.

At this time other Chinese units were also pressing onto the Japanese positions. On 11 December Chinese reinforcements broke through the Japanese lines and into the city, which resulted in intense house-to-house fighting. The Chinese then proceeded to cut the Japanese supply lines. Depleted of food and ammunition, the Japanese retreated on 13 December. The Chinese pursued them for more than 20 days. By 5 January 1944 Japanese forces had withdrawn to their original positions before the offensive. Following the battle, the Chinese displayed an array of captured Japanese weapons and equipment, as well as numerous Japanese troops taken as prisoners, for inspection by allied military observers.

During this campaign, apart from the Reserve 10th Division's Sun Mingjin, two other Chinese division commanders were killed: the 44th Corps' 150th Division's Lieutenant General Xu Guozhang was killed at Taifushan in Changde's northwest, aged 37, while the 73rd corps' 5th Division's Lieutenant General Peng Shiliang(:zh:彭士量) was killed at the Taoyuan-Shimen line, aged 38.

The Changde campaign saw the largest participation of the Chinese air force since the Battle of Wuhan.

Reporter Israel Epstein witnessed and reported on the battle. Witold Urbanowicz, a Polish fighter ace engaged in air combat over China in 1943, saw the city just after the battle.

Cultural references
The 2010 Chinese war film Death and Glory in Changde is based on the events in this battle.

References

Sources

External links

Axis History Forum Index; WW2 in the Pacific & Asia; Battle of Changde Order of Battle and Map, Photos from Changde War Memorial
RESISTANCE WARS; Campaign of E-Xi, Battle Of Changde
Captured Japanese soldier

Conflicts in 1943
1943 in China
Changde 1943
Military operations involving chemical weapons
Military history of Hunan
November 1943 events
December 1943 events